

Presidents Cup (Southern Conference)

Teams

Ladder 
The ladder below reflects the 9 out of scheduled 15 rounds that were completed prior to the suspension and subsequent cancellation of the competition. The cause was lockdown measures used to combat the delta variant of the COVID-19 pandemic in New South Wales. Originally scheduled for 8 May 2021, Round 5 was washed out and postponed until 24 July 2021, however, due to the lockdown the round was not played.

Regular season

Round 1

Round 2 

April 24 
Collegians Red Dogs 26 beat Thirroul Butchers 14 at Gibson Park on Saturday, 24 April 2021. 
Wests Devils 42 beat Corrimal Cougars 42-22 on Saturday, 24 April 2021. 
Dapto Canaries had the bye. 

May 1 
Corrimal Cougars 24 beat Dapto Canaries 16 at Ziems Park on Saturday, 1 May 2021. 
Thirroul Butchers beat Wests Devils at Parrish Park on Saturday, 1 May 2021. 
Collegians Red Dogs had the bye. 

May 8 
Corrimal Cougars versus Collegians Red Dogs at Ziems Park on Saturday, 8 May 2021 was washed out. 
Dapto Canaries versus Wests Devils was also abandoned, the two games were rescheduled to be played on July 24. 
Thirroul Butchers had the bye.

May 15-16 Representative Weekend 
Open Age Men: Newcastle Rebels 36 beat Illawarra Steelers 4 at Collegians Sporting Complex on Sunday, 16 May 2021. 
Under 20s Men : Newcastle Rebels 26 beat Illawarra Steelers 22 at Collegians Sporting Complex on Sunday, 16 May 2021. 

May 22 
Wests Devils 40 beat Collegians Red Dogs 16 at Parrish Park on Saturday, 22 May 2021. 
Thirroul Butchers 32 beat Dapto Canaries 12 at Gibson Park on Saturday, 22 May 2021. 
Corrimal Cougars had the bye. 

May 29 
Thirroul Butchers 24 beat Corrimal Cougars 14 on Saturday, 29 May 2021. 
Collegians Red Dogs 62 beat Dapto Canaries 10 on Saturday, 29 May 2021. 
Wests Devils had the bye. 

June 5 
Thirroul Butchers 26 neat Collegians Red Dogs 18 on Saturday, 5 June 2021.
Wests Devils 42 beat Corrimal Cougars 16 on Saturday, 5 June 2021. 
Dapto Canaries had the bye.

June 12 
There were no games scheduled on this long weekend.

June 19 
Thirroul Butchers 16 beat Wests Devils 2 at Gibson Park on Saturday, 19 June 2021. 
Corrimal Cougars 22 beat Dapto Canaries 20 at Groundz Precinct on Saturday, 19 June 3021. 
Collegians Red Dogs had the bye. 

June 26 
Collegians Red Dogs beat Corrimal Cougars at Collegians Sports Centre on Saturday, 26 June 2021.
Wests Devils 54 beat Dapto 8 at Parrish Park on Saturday, 26 June 2021. 
Thirroul Butchers had the bye.

1st Division

Teams

Ladder

Regular season

Round 1

Round 2

2nd Division

Teams

Ladder

Regular season

Round 1

Round 2

Under-18's

Teams

Ladder

Regular season

Round 1

Round 2

Teams in Recent Seasons 
Due to the COVID-19 pandemic in Australia the commencement of Illawarra 2020 season was postponed. Due to financial considerations, Collegians decided not to field senior teams and the IRL took a decision NOT to run a First Grade competition in 2020.

Three clubs – Helensburgh, Thirroul and Wests – elected to enter their highest grade team in NSWRL competitions. Delayed and restructured, IRL competition matches began on 25 July 2020.

The following table lists the clubs and the teams they fielded in the 2019 and 2020 senior competitions: 1st Grade, Reserve Grade (2nd), Division 2 (Div2), Under 18s (U18), Women's tackle (Wom), Women's Under 18 (WU18), Ladies League Tag (LLT), Open Age, NSWRL President's Cup (PC) and Sydney Shield (SS).

References 

2021 in Australian rugby league
Rugby league in New South Wales
Rugby league competitions in New South Wales